(born 13 June 1973 in Kobe, Japan) is a former French–Japanese actress and journalist. She is a former CNN correspondent in Japan, as well as being a former game show host.

During her youth, Michelle lived with her grandparents in Northwestern France before enrolling into an international school in Kobe, Japan. Ferre later enrolled in Sophia University in Tokyo, majoring in International Relations and Political Science. Her ability to speak both English and Japanese led her to pursue a career in journalism. She lived in Tokyo throughout her schooling and professional career.

Michelle Ferre's first acting experience was opposite Jackie Chan in the 1998 Hong Kong martial arts film Who Am I?. Jackie Chan became intrigued by Ferre's personality while being interviewed  on the set of Who Am I?. Chan invited Ferre to audition for the film and she received the co-starring role of Christine Stark.

Ferre's next acting role was in the 2006 Japanese drama So-Run Movie. She also appeared on the stage in Ryô Iwamatsu's Akugi.

Filmography

External links

1973 births
Living people
CNN people
Japanese actresses
Japanese people of French descent
Japanese reporters and correspondents
Sophia University alumni